The 2008 Champion Hurdle was a horse race held at Cheltenham Racecourse on Tuesday 11 March 2008. It was the 78th running of the Champion Hurdle.

The winner was the DSJP Syndicate's Katchit, a five-year-old gelding trained in Wiltshire by Alan King and ridden by Robert Thornton. The victory was the first in the race, for owner, trainer and jockey.

Katchit won at odds of 10/1 by a length from Osana. As of 2017, he remains the only five-year-old to win the race since See You Then in 1985. The field included Sublimity, the winner of the race in the previous year. Fourteen of the fifteen runners completed the course.

Race details
 Sponsor: Smurfit Kappa
 Purse: £350,000; First prize: £205,272
 Going: Good to Soft
 Distance: 2 miles 110 yards
 Number of runners: 15
 Winner's time: 4m 08.10

Full result

 Abbreviations: nse = nose; nk = neck; hd = head; dist = distance; UR = unseated rider; PU = pulled up

Winner's details
Further details of the winner, Katchit
 Sex: Gelding
 Foaled: 23 February 2003
 Country: Ireland
 Sire: Kalanisi; Dam: Miracle (Ezzoud)
 Owner: D S J P Syndicate
 Breeder: Whitley Stud

References

Champion Hurdle
 2008
Champion Hurdle
Champion Hurdle
2000s in Gloucestershire